The men's 4 × 200 metre freestyle relay competition of the swimming events at the 1963 Pan American Games took place on April. The defending Pan American Games champion is the United States.

Results
All times are in minutes and seconds.

Heats

Final 
The final was held on April.

References

Swimming at the 1963 Pan American Games